Yuri Vladimirovich Dobryshkin (born 19 July 1979 in Penza, Soviet Union) is a Russian former professional ice hockey player. He played in the Russian Superleague and the Kontinental Hockey League for Krylia Sovetov, AK Bars Kazan, Severstal Cherepovets, Metallurg Magnitogorsk, HC CSKA Moscow, Torpedo Nizhny Novgorod, Atlant Moscow Oblast and HC Dynamo Moscow. He was selected by Atlanta Thrashers in the 6th round (159th overall) of the 1999 NHL Entry Draft.

References

External links

1979 births
Living people
Russian ice hockey right wingers
HC Dynamo Moscow players
Atlanta Thrashers draft picks
Krylya Sovetov Moscow players
Ak Bars Kazan players
Severstal Cherepovets players
Metallurg Magnitogorsk players
HC CSKA Moscow players
Torpedo Nizhny Novgorod players
Atlant Moscow Oblast players
HC MVD players
Dizel Penza players